The 2021–22 NCAA Division III men's ice hockey season began on October 16, 2021, and concluded on March 26, 2022. This was the 49th season of Division III college ice hockey.

Regular season
Before the start of the season, Division III lost three programs. Bryn Athyn downgraded to club status due to not having a facility near enough to their campus, St. Thomas promoted its program to Division I and Becker College was forced to close as a result of financial difficulties. Stepping into the void, Arcadia and Rivier both began their varsity programs this year.

Due to COVID-19 protocols, several games were canceled, postponed, or rescheduled over the course of the season. As a result, several conferences played unbalanced schedules and relied on winning percentages to determine the final standings.

Standings

Note: Mini-game are not included in final standings

2022 NCAA Tournament

Note: * denotes overtime period(s)

See also
 2021–22 NCAA Division I men's ice hockey season
 2021–22 NCAA Division II men's ice hockey season

References

External links

 
NCAA